DXKC-DTV (channel 31) is a television station in Metro Davao, Philippines, serving as the Mindanao flagship of Broadcast Enterprises and Affiliated Media, Inc. The station maintains a transmitter facility along Broadcast Ave., Shrine Hills, Brgy. Matina Crossing, Davao City.

History
It was started as Cinema Television (or CTV-31) in 1995. It was also the first UHF station to be inspired by a movie television. And on year 1997, it had its broadcast rights form E!, an American-cable network channel that features fashion and lifestyle show, which is lately known as E! Philippines. But in the year 2003 RMN decided to cancel its operation to TV network, citing financial constraints and poor ratings.

On July 3, 2011, UHF 31 in Davao and all RMN TV stations nationwide returned as a test broadcast, as the frequency was occupied by Broadcast Enterprises and Affiliated Media, following the latter was bought up by Bethlehem Holdings, Inc. (funded by Globe Telecom's Group Retirement Fund) from RMN. Under new ownership, BEAM began its affiliation partnership with Solar Entertainment Corporation.

On June 28, 2013, Solar Entertainment was forced to reduce its Free TV broadcast to 18 hours a day on BEAM in compliance with the National Telecommunications Commission's guidelines. However, it still continues on cable networks 24 hours a day.

On September 1, 2014, BEAM Channel 31 and its provincial affiliates ended its partnership with Solar, as BEAM prepares its ISDB-T digital television.

BEAM TV provincial stations ceased its analog transmission on March 29, 2022 (3 months after BEAM TV 31 Manila closed down its analog signal for the second time on January 1, 2022), as its now fully migrated to digital broadcast permanently. As of March 30, 2022 (a day after its analog shutdown), BEAM TV Digital broadcast started to operate on UHF 31, but still under maintenance as the network still trying to migrate its signal operations which is currently using the digital transmission on UHF 32 in the area. On April 6, 2022, BEAM TV announced launched of PIE, a new channel that co-ownership with ABS-CBN Corporation, Kroma Entertainment and 917Ventures, on May 23, 2022 as the all-new "tradigital" entertainment channel.

Digital television

Digital channels

DXKC-TV currently operates on UHF Channel 31 (575.143 MHz) and is multiplexed into the following subchannels:

Areas of coverage

Primary areas 
 Davao City
 Davao del Sur
 Davao del Norte

Secondary areas 
 Portion of Davao de Oro

BEAM TV stations nationwide

References

Television stations in Davao City
Television channels and stations established in 1995
Digital television stations in the Philippines